Dylan Woodhead (born 25 September 1998) is an American water polo player. He competed in the 2020 Summer Olympics. He played college water polo at Stanford University.

References

External links
 Stanford Cardinal bio

1998 births
Living people
Water polo players at the 2020 Summer Olympics
American male water polo players
Olympic water polo players of the United States
People from San Anselmo, California
Stanford Cardinal men's water polo players